The Grain and Lumber Exchange Building is a historic office building in Winona, Minnesota, United States.  It was designed in Renaissance Revival
style by the architectural firm of Kees & Colburn and built in 1900.  The building was listed on the National Register of Historic Places in 1977 for its local significance in the theme of architecture.  It was nominated for being among Winona's most architecturally distinctive office buildings from the turn of the 20th century.  It is also notable for being designed to the specifications of its first tenants even though they were primarily renters rather than owners.

See also
 National Register of Historic Places listings in Winona County, Minnesota

References

1900 establishments in Minnesota
Buildings and structures in Winona, Minnesota
National Register of Historic Places in Winona County, Minnesota
Office buildings completed in 1900
Office buildings on the National Register of Historic Places in Minnesota
Renaissance Revival architecture in Minnesota